Cunningham–Graham Close is an historic building in the centre of Perth, Perth and Kinross, Scotland. Located at 13–17 High Street, it is a Category B listed building, built in 1699. It is the oldest continually inhabited building in the city, and one of the few remaining that pre-date the Georgian new town remodelling of the city centre.

A monogram with the carving "RG, EC" and its year of construction is located above the entrance to the close. These initials refer to Robert Graham and Elspeth Cunningham, for whom the building is named.

The building is three storeys and an attic.

In 2016, a project that renovated the property won the biennial Perth Civic Trust Award.

See also
List of listed buildings in Perth, Scotland

References

External links
View of the building from High Street – Google Street View, March 2019

1699 establishments in Scotland
Listed buildings in Perth, Scotland
Category B listed buildings in Perth and Kinross